The Force India VJM07 is a Formula One racing car designed by Force India to compete in the 2014 Formula One season. It was driven by Nico Hülkenberg, who returned to the team after racing for Sauber in 2013, and Sergio Pérez, who joined the team after leaving McLaren. The VJM07 was designed to use Mercedes' new 1.6-litre V6 turbocharged engine, the PU106A Hybrid as well as Petronas fuels.

History

A rendered image of the VJM07 was released on Twitter on 23 January, making it the first 2014 Formula One design to be revealed to public.

The team ultimately finished the season sixth in the Constructors' Championship.

The car performed very well in the early races with the team consistently scoring well. The team nearly got a podium in the 2014 Canadian Grand Prix but driver Sergio Pérez was involved in a huge crash with Williams' Felipe Massa 2 laps from the end. Due to the financial limitations of the team, the car could not be developed like the leading teams' cars and the pace dropped off towards the end of the season.

This allowed the team to gain data on the new tyre compounds and degradation.

Complete Formula One results
(key) (results in italics indicate fastest lap)

† — Driver failed to finish the race, but was classified as they had completed greater than 90% of the race distance.
‡ — Teams and drivers scored double points at the

References

Force India Formula One cars
2014 Formula One season cars